Sainte-Marie-la-Mer (before 2017: Sainte-Marie) is a commune in the Pyrénées-Orientales department in southern France.

Geography 
Sainte-Marie-la-Mer is located east of Perpignan, in the canton of Perpignan-2 and in the arrondissement of Perpignan.

History

Administration

List of mayors 
 Pierre Roig (UMP): since 2001, elected again in 2008.
 Edmond Jorda, elected in 2020

Population

Economy

Culture

See also
Communes of the Pyrénées-Orientales department

External links 

 Official site

References

Communes of Pyrénées-Orientales
Populated coastal places in France